Nalus District is in Oshnavieh County, West Azerbaijan province, Iran. At the 2006 National Census, its population was 15,316 in 2,735 households. The following census in 2011 counted 16,007 people in 4,097 households. At the latest census in 2016, the district had 16,258 inhabitants in 4,119 households.

References 

Oshnavieh County

Districts of West Azerbaijan Province

Populated places in West Azerbaijan Province

Populated places in Oshnavieh County